The 1868 United States presidential election in Alabama took place on November 3, 1868, as part of the 1868 presidential election. Alabama voters chose eight representatives, or electors, to the Electoral College, who voted for president and vice president.

Alabama was won by Ulysses S. Grant, formerly the 6th Commanding General of the United States Army (R-Illinois), running with Speaker of the House Schuyler Colfax, with 51.25% of the popular vote, against the 18th governor of New York, Horatio Seymour (D–New York), running with former Senator Francis Preston Blair Jr., with 48.75% of the vote.

Results

See also 
 United States presidential elections in Alabama

References 

Alabama
1868
1868 Alabama elections